Paul Spurrier (born 23 May 1967 Suffolk) is a British former child actor on stage, television, and film, and a screenwriter and film director. He appeared in more than thirty different roles, with credits including Anna Karenina and The Lost Boys for the BBC, Tales of the Unexpected for Anglia Television, and the feature film The Wild Geese as Richard Harris's son Emile. He also appeared in  – an Australian/German TV-Serial in 4 parts in 1982. Here he played the role of the 15-year-old boy and his adventures in the Australian outback with Aboriginal Australians.

Education
Spurrier was educated at Norwich School, an independent school in the city of Norwich in East Anglia, followed by the University of Southern California and the London International Film School.

Life and career
Spurrier worked for the Ministry of Defence in Great Britain and for such companies as Avid, 3Com, and Cisco before writing and directing feature films including Live on Arrival, Underground (1998), and P (2005). The latter was made in the Thai language in Thailand, where Spurrier has now settled. In 2007, Spurrier was director of photography for The Edge of Empire—an epic historical drama about the birth of the Thai nation. In 2009, he was director of photography for 60 episodes of a Thai television series Nak Su Nork Sang Wian, the first time a Westerner had performed this task. In 2008 and 2009, Spurrier was the international administration director of the Bangkok International Film Festival, and the programming director for the Thailand International Film Destination Festival. In 2015 he directed the Thai feature film The Forest, and in 2019 Eullenia.  In 2021, in collaboration with the Thai writer, composer, and conductor, S. P. Somtow (Somtow Sucharitkul) he directed The Maestro: A Symphony of Terror.

Selected filmography
 The Wild Geese (1978)
 The Devil's Crown (1978)
 Lady Oscar (1979)
  (1982, TV miniseries)
 King of the Wind (1989)
 Underground (1998)
 P (2005)
 The Forest (2016)
 Eullenia (2018, Series)
 The Maestro (2021)

Awards
 P - Erlangen Weekend of Fear Film Festival - Audience Best Film Award (2005)
 P - Erlangen Weekend of Fear Film Festival - Jury Silver Award (2005)
 The Forest - Bucheon International Fantastic Film Festival - NETPAC Award (2016)
 The Forest - Ferrara Film Festival - Golden Dragon Award - Best Director (2016)
 The Forest - Kom Chat Leuk Thai Film Awards - Best Actor (2017)
 Eullenia - Buffalo Dreams Fantastic Film Festival - Outstanding Director (2018)
 Eullenia - Cine Fantasy - Prêmio de Melhor Longa pelo Júri Popular  (2018)
 Eullenia - Cine Fantasy - Melhor Filme (2018)
 Eullenia - Terror In The Bay Film Festival - Best Director (2018)
 The Maestro - Casablanca Film Factory Awards - Best Feature Film (2022)

References

External links
 
 Interview with Paul Spurrier, Eat My Brains, 11 August 2005
 , Big Chilli, 19 October 2018
 Review of The Forest, Variety, 21 August 2016

Living people
English male child actors
English film directors
English expatriates in Thailand
1967 births
University of Southern California alumni
People educated at Norwich School